Bembicium is a genus of sea snails, marine gastropod mollusks in the family Littorinidae, the winkles or periwinkles.

Species
Species within the genus Bembicium include:

 Bembicium altum (Tate, 1894)
 Bembicium auratum (Quoy & Gaimard, 1834)
 Bembicium discoideum Reid, 1988
 Bembicium flavescens (Philippi, 1851)
 Bembicium melanostoma (Gmelin, 1791)
 Bembicium nanum (Lamarck, 1822)
 Bembicium priscum Powell & Bartrum, 1929
 Bembicium vittatum Philippi, 1846

References

Littorinidae